Ostay-ye Olya (also Romanized as Ostāy-ye ‘Olyā; also known as 'Ostā-ye Bālā, Ostāy, Qal‘eh Istui, Qal‘eh-ye Isūn, and Qal‘eh-ye Ostā’ī) is a village in Jannatabad Rural District, Salehabad County, Razavi Khorasan Province, Iran. At the 2006 census, its population was 196, in 38 families.

References 

Populated places in   Torbat-e Jam County